Texas Tech University Health Sciences Center at Dallas (TTUHSC Dallas) is a branch campus of Texas Tech University Health Sciences Center (TTUHSC) located in Dallas, Texas.

The TTUHSC School of Pharmacy is the only academic unit to offer classes at the campus.  Lower-level students take the first two years of courses at the TTUHSC Amarillo campus.  TTUHSC Dallas is located adjacent to the Southwestern Medical District in Dallas, that includes institutions such as Children's Medical Center Dallas, Parkland Memorial Hospital, and UT Southwestern Medical Center.  TTUHSC Dallas was home to the only pharmacy school serving the North Texas region until 2011 when the UNT System College of Pharmacy was established at the University of North Texas Health Science Center in Fort Worth.

External links
TTUHSC Dallas website

Dallas
Universities and colleges in Dallas